Cromer, Manitoba is a village located in the Rural Municipality of Pipestone, in south-western Manitoba, Canada in a region called Westman.

In 1884 the Post Office was opened at LSD 26-8-28W and was known as Elm Valley. The name was changed to Cromer when the Canadian Northern Railway came through in 1907.

The community is situated alongside Pipestone Creek in the Pipestone Valley. The valley was formed almost 20,000 years ago during the melting of the last glaciation. The melting waters formed the Pipestone Spillway, which is the valley seen today. The village sits at the intersections of roads 256 and 255 and consists of several businesses, residences, and churches. There is also an ice rink and a 9-hole golf course.

Enbridge Line 2B starts just north of the village at the Tundra Oil & Gas plant.

Cromer United Church

The Cromer United Church, built in 1911, is designated "Manitoba Municipal Heritage Site No. 89" and part of the Canadian Register of Historic Places. It was originally called Cromer Methodist Church and was built for the Methodist congregation and its architecture is a modest Gothic Revival-style wooden church. As a heritage site, it was recognised on 10 December, 1992 and was listed in the Canadian Register on 17 February, 2006.

Notable residents
Mary Carter, judge

See also
 List of historic places in Westman Region, Manitoba
 List of oil pipelines
 Cromer, England

References

External links
 Geographic Names of Manitoba (pg. 57) - the Millennium Bureau of Canada

Unincorporated communities in Westman Region